Vi på Saltkråkan (We on Salt-Crow Island) is a Swedish TV series in 13 25-minute episodes from 1964. The script for the series was written by Astrid Lindgren, who later re-wrote it as a book, also titled Vi på Saltkråkan (published in English as Seacrow Island in 1964). Astrid Lindgren was closely involved in the filming and editing of the series, which took place on Norröra in the Stockholm archipelago. The series was produced and directed by Olle Hellbom.

Plot
The series tells the story of a family from Stockholm, consisting of the widowed author Melker Melkersson (played by Torsten Lilliecrona) and his four children: 19-year-old Malin (played by Louise Edlind) who assumes the role of mother in the family, the imaginative 13-year-old Johan, 12-year-old Niklas who is calm and down-to-earth, and 7-year-old Pelle, who loves animals of all kinds. The Melkersson family spend their summer holidays as well as some winters on Saltkråkan, an idyllic place symbolising the unspoilt archipelago. The year-round inhabitants of the island are sometimes amused by the ineptness of the city dwellers, but they become fast friends with the Melkersson family: when the idyll is threatened, such as when the house the Melkerssons rent is being sold, the islanders rise to help their friends keep their summer paradise.

The Melkersson children become friends with the local kids: Tjorven (actually Maria) Grankvist who is the same age as Pelle and who owns a huge St. Bernard dog named Båtsman (Boatswain), her older sisters Teddy and Freddy who teach Johan and Niklas to row and sail, and Stina, a gap-toothed Stockholm girl who spends her summer holidays with her grandfather, and who tells endless stories to the long-suffering adults around her. (Astrid Lindgren added the character of Stina to the script when Olle Hellbom had met Kristina Jämtmark and thought that she would make a good addition to the group of children.)

The 13 episodes of the TV series were re-made into a movie in 1968, but the original TV series is re-run almost yearly in Swedish television, and some of the actors have become very closely associated with their characters in the series. The series has been translated into German, and was popular enough to be broadcast more than 20 times.

Movie spin-offs
The popularity of the series led to the production of four full-length movies:
Tjorven, Båtsman och Moses (1964)
Tjorven och Skrållan (1965)
Tjorven och Mysak (1966)
Skrållan, Ruskprick och Knorrhane (1967)

Cast
Torsten Lilliecrona - Melker Melkersson 
Louise Edlind - Malin Melkersson *Stephen Lindholm - Pelle Melkersson 
Björn Söderbäck - Johan Melkersson 
Urban Strand - Niklas Melkersson 
Bengt Eklund - Nisse Grankvist 
Eva Stiberg - Märta Grankvist 
Maria Johansson - Maria "Tjorven" Grankvist
Lillemor Österlund - Teddy Grankvist 
Bitte Ulvskog - Freddy Grankvist 
Sigge Fischer - Söderman
Kristina Jämtmark - Stina, Söderman's granddaughter 
Tommy Johnson - Björn 
Märta Arbin - Mrs Sjöblom 
Alf Östlund - Mr Carlberg 
Vivianne Westman - Lotta, Carlberg's daughter 
Birger Lensander - Mr Mattson
Stig Hallgren - Farmer Jansson 
Eddie Axberg - Kalle 
Lars Göran Carlson - Krister
Sven Almgren - Berra

References

External links
Life on Seacrow Island
 Saltkråkan symbol för sommar, sol och skärgård "Seacrow Island is a symbol of the summer, sun and archipelago"

Astrid Lindgren
Swedish children's television series
1964 books
1964 Swedish television series debuts
1964 Swedish television series endings
Swedish television sitcoms
1960s Swedish television series
Television series set on fictional islands
Television series about vacationing
Television shows set in Sweden
Swedish-language television shows